Trish Karter is an American entrepreneur and the founder of the Dancing Deer Baking Co.

Early life and education

Karter is a graduate of Lyme-Old Lyme High School, Wheaton College, and the Yale School of Management.

She is the daughter of Peter Karter, a pioneer of the modern materials recycling industry.   Karter lives in Milton, Massachusetts and is the mother of two children, Dimitri and Eleanna Antoniou.

Career

Karter was the founder and CEO of the Dancing Deer Baking Company, a Boston-based producer of high-end, natural baked goods for nationwide distribution.   The company is known for its commitment to employing and providing opportunity to individuals from deprived backgrounds.

The company is noted for producing all-natural, preservative-free products.

Karter is also an artist; part of the success of the Dancing Deer line of baked goods is credited to the "whimsical" figures that she has created to decorate the company's packaging.

References

Wheaton College (Massachusetts) alumni
Yale School of Management alumni
American women chief executives
People from Old Lyme, Connecticut
People from Milton, Massachusetts
Living people
American chief executives of food industry companies
Year of birth missing (living people)
21st-century American women